Dogear may refer to:

Dog ear, an informal term for folding the corner of a page to mark a location in a book, as opposed to using an actual bookmark
Dog Ear Creek, a stream in South Dakota
Dog Ear Lake, a lake in South Dakota
Dog Ear Records, a record label
dogear, social bookmarking software developed by IBM for use on corporate intranets